Tomashevo is a rural locality (a village) in Orlovskoye Rural Settlement, Velikoustyugsky District, Vologda Oblast, Russia. The population was 123 as of 2002.

Geography 
Tomashevo is located 80 km southeast of Veliky Ustyug (the district's administrative centre) by road. Kurdenga is the nearest rural locality.

References 

Rural localities in Velikoustyugsky District